Veal is a Canadian indie rock band with country music influences. Originally based in Vancouver, the band later moved to Toronto, Ontario.

History
Veal was formed in Vancouver in 1994. The band included guitarist Luke Doucet,
 and drummer Chang.  Early bassists in Veal include Howard Redekopp and Barry Mirochnick.  In 1996 the group released their first album, Hot Loser.

The band played a showcase at Canadian Music Week in Toronto in 1999. That year they released a second album, Tilt O'Whirl, which was recorded in Vancouver but mixed in Toronto.  The band signed with music promoter Shauna de Cartier, who formed Six Shooter Records in order to release the band's work. The album was included in CBC RadioSonic's best of 1998 broadcast." Indie by nature". Globe and Mail, May 10, 2001

Bassist Nik Kozub, (now of Shout Out Out Out Out), later joined the band.

Doucet began a solo career in 2001 with the release of his album Aloha, Manitoba; he continued to perform and record with Veal.  The band released a third album in 2003, The Embattled Hearts.

Discography
1996 Hot Loser
1999 Tilt O'Whirl
2003 The Embattled Hearts

References

External links
 Luke Doucet

Musical groups established in 1994
Musical groups from Vancouver
Canadian indie rock groups
Six Shooter Records artists
1994 establishments in British Columbia